Rao Sonag was a rajput belonging to the Rathore clan. His father was Rao Sheoji and his mother hailed from the Chavda clan of rajputs.

Sonag was a brother of Rao Asthan, ruler of Kheda. The two brothers together conquered the town of Idar and Sonag settled there. Consequently, his male-line descendants are known as "Idariya Rathores."

References
Maheca Rathaurom ka mula itihasa: Ravala Mallinatha ke vamsaja - Maheca, Baramera, Pokarana, Kotariya aura Khavariya Rathaurom ka sodhapurna itihasa by Dr. Hukam Singh Bhati. Publisher: Ratan Prakashan, Jodhpur (1990)''

Year of birth missing
Year of death missing
Rajput rulers